James "Jim" Soletski was a Democratic Party member of the Wisconsin State Assembly, representing the 88th Assembly District from 2007 through 2011.  He was born and currently resides in Green Bay, Wisconsin.

Soletski served as Chairman of the Assembly Energy and Utilities Committee, and as a member of the Colleges and Universities, Consumer Protection, Criminal Justice, Elections and Campaign Reform and Labor committees. In addition to these responsibilities he sat on the Special Committee on State-Tribal Relations.  In the November  2010 election Soletski was defeated by Republican nominee John Klenke.

Notes

External links
 Follow the Money - James Soletski
2008 20062002 2000 1998 campaign contributions
Campaign 2008 campaign contributions at Wisconsin Democracy Campaign

1948 births
Living people
21st-century American politicians
Democratic Party members of the Wisconsin State Assembly